Anatane: Saving the Children of Okura is an animated children's television series created by French artist Mark Maggiori. The show, a Canada-France international co-production, was produced by Les Films de la Perrine and Tooncan in conjunction with France Télévisions.

Production

In 2002, Mark Maggiori received funding to develop "Anton ou Les enfants d’Okura" from the CNC. A year later, he registered the domain name Anatane.com. French animation website Catsuka noticed references to an animated series on his website and reached out to him in September 2004. Maggiori stated that the show was in development with France Télévisions and Canal J at Les Films de la Perrine with an expected release in 2006. At the time, he had hoped Japanese animation studio Production I.G. would agree to co-produce it.

Shortly after, users on the site discovered that much of the Anatane concept art had directly lifted imagery from a number of anime productions. Maggiori responded to the allegations by claiming they were placeholder images that wouldn't make it into the final show. Catsuka members later uncovered additional plagiarized work by Maggiori that eventually led to them creating a contest to discover more.

In 2005, Canadian animation studio Tooncan was brought on as co-producers, with France 2 as the broadcaster and Carrere Group as the distributor. The budget was set at €5.9 million, with production expected to wrap up by September 2006. In 2007, the series received capital from the Shaw Rocket Fund, with the Canadian broadcast partner listed as Télé-Québec.

The following year, Anantane was presented at Cartoons on the Bay. It was also showcased at the 2008 Annecy International Animated Film Festival where it was reported that five episodes had been completed, but that the series was unlikely to be finished. Shortly after, Carrere Group filed for bankruptcy.

In 2017, work on the series resumed at Megafun Productions, a Canadian animation studio founded by former Tooncan owner Paul Cadieux.

Broadcast

Anatane debuted in Canada on Unis TV on September 8, 2018. In France, the series began airing on France 4 on June 29, 2019. The first three episodes were made available through the channel's website on June 7.

References

External links
 France.tv page 
 Unis TV page 

2010s Canadian animated television series
2010s French animated television series
Canadian children's animated action television series
Canadian children's animated adventure television series
Dystopian animated television series
French children's animated action television series
French children's animated adventure television series
Anime-influenced Western animated television series
2018 Canadian television series debuts
France Télévisions children's television series